Anne Carolyn Twomey (born June 7, 1951) is an American actress.

Early life

Born in Boston, Massachusetts, daughter of Muriel Descoteaux Twomey and Harry F. Twomey Jr. of Gladwyne, Pennsylvania. She has a brother, John Twomey.

Career
Twomey earned critical acclaim for her performance in the 1980 play Nuts, for which she won the Theatre World Award and was nominated for the Tony Award for Best Performance by a Leading Actress in a Play. Her additional Broadway credits include To Grandmother's House We Go (1981) and Tennessee Williams' Orpheus Descending (1989). Off-Broadway she appeared in Vieux Carré (1983), also by Williams, which garnered her a Drama Desk Award nomination for Outstanding Featured Actress in a Play, and The Vampires (1984).

Twomey's feature film credits include Deadly Friend (1986), Last Rites (1988), The Scout (1994), Picture Perfect (1997), and The Confession.

Twomey had recurring roles in the 1993 season of L.A. Law and the 2000–01 season of Third Watch. She has made guest appearances on Shannon, The Cosby Show, The Twilight Zone, Magnum, P.I., Seinfeld, Spin City, Law & Order, Law & Order: Special Victims Unit, and Law & Order: Criminal Intent, and had a featured role in the 1998 television remake of Rear Window starring Christopher Reeve and Daryl Hannah.

Twomey has narrated several audiobooks, including works by Dean Koontz, Joyce Carol Oates, Tracy Chevalier, and M. T. Anderson.

Charity work
Twomey has worked with prisoners at Rehabilitation Through the Arts.

Personal life
Twomey married John Bedford Lloyd in 1986. They have two daughters together, Hannah and Elizabeth.

Filmography

Film

Television

Theatre

References

External links
 
 
 Anne Twomey at AudioFile

1951 births
Living people
American stage actresses
American film actresses
American television actresses
Actresses from Boston
20th-century American actresses
21st-century American actresses